Petter Jacob Semb Meyer (born 22 March 1902) was a Norwegian barrister, judge and politician.

He was born in Tjølling to ship owner Børre Anton Meyer and Maren Semb Meyer, and graduated as cand.jur. in 1934. He was elected representative to the Storting for the period 1937–1945, for the Conservative Party. He served as judge of the Eidsivating Court of Appeal from 1961–1972.

References

1902 births
Year of death missing
People from Larvik
20th-century Norwegian judges
Conservative Party (Norway) politicians
Members of the Storting
Berg concentration camp survivors